Edward Rae Cordner (18 June 1887 – 21 July 1963) was an Australian rules footballer who played with Melbourne and University in the Victorian Football League (VFL).

Family
The son of Edward James Cordner (1856-1930), and Helen Cordner (1860-1952), née Rae, Edward Rae Cordner was born at Sandhurst, now known as Bendigo, in Victoria on 18 June 1887.

Whilst serving in the First AIF, he married Margaret Constance Pruen, at Cheltenham, in England, on 23 January 1918.

Ted's brother Harry Cordner — "Harry" Cordner, who was overseas at the time that war broke out, was commissioned as an officer in the Royal Army Medical Corps, and served in France. — and two of his cousins Alan Cordner and "Larry" Cordner, also played senior VFL football.

Education
Educated at Melbourne Grammar School, Ted entered into residence at Trinity College, Melbourne in 1906, and graduated M.B.B.S. from the University of Melbourne on 23 December 1910.

In 1910, he shared the prestigious Beaney Scholarship for Surgery, with his fellow Old Melburnian, University Football Club team-mate, and fellow medical student, Athol Tymms.

Football
Ted played two senior VFL games with Melbourne in 1905, while still a pupil at Melbourne Grammar.

Admitted to Melbourne University in 1906, he played for the University team for two seasons (1906 and 1907) in the Metropolitan Junior Football Association (MJFA); and, then, when the University team was admitted to the VFL competition in 1908, he played another 60 VFL games for University over five seasons (1908 to 1912), as both a student and a graduate of the university. He left Australia for England in 1913 to advance his medical career, and did not play in the VFL ever again.

Military service
Captain (later, Major) Edward Rae Cordner, served as a medical officer in the 6th Field Ambulance.

Death
He died at the Diamond Valley Community Hospital in Greensborough on 21 July 1963.

See also
 List of Australian rules football families

Footnotes

References
 Holmesby, Russell & Main, Jim (2007). The Encyclopedia of AFL Footballers. 7th ed. Melbourne: Bas Publishing.
 World War One Embarkation Roll: Captain Edward Rae Cordner, collection of the Australian War Memorial.
 World War One Nominal Roll: Major Edward Rae Cordner, collection of the Australian War Memorial.
 World War One Service Record: Major Edward Rae Cordner, National Archives of Australia.

External links

 
 Ted Cordner b1887, at Boyles Football Photos.
 Edward Cordner, at Demonwiki.

1887 births
People educated at Melbourne Grammar School
People educated at Trinity College (University of Melbourne)
Australian rules footballers from Bendigo
Melbourne Football Club players
University Football Club players
Australian military personnel of World War I
1963 deaths